Zaiton binti Ismail is a Malaysian politician who served as Member of the Johor State Executive Council (EXCO) in the Barisan Nasional (BN) state administration under Menteri Besar Hasni Mohammad from March 2020 to March 2022 and Member of the Johor State Legislative Assembly (MLA) for Sungai Balang from May 2013 to March 2022. She is a member of the United Malays National Organisation (UMNO), a component party of the ruling BN coalition.

Election Results

References 

Living people
Year of birth missing (living people)
People from Muar
People from Johor
Malaysian people of Malay descent
Malaysian Muslims
United Malays National Organisation politicians
Women MLAs in Johor
21st-century Malaysian politicians
Members of the Johor State Legislative Assembly
Johor state executive councillors
21st-century Malaysian women politicians